The Last Days of the Dinosaurs is a 2022 popular paleontology book by science writer Riley Black. Beginning just before the Cretaceous–Paleogene extinction event, Black's book focuses on the aftermath of the asteroid impact and the way that life came back in the million years following the death of the dinosaurs. Styled in creative nonfiction, the book received universally positive reviews.

References

External links 
 Google Books - The Last Days of the Dinosaurs
 Macmillan Publishers - The Last Days of the Dinosaurs

2022 non-fiction books
Paleontology books